Picconia excelsa is a species of Picconia, endemic to Macaronesia, occurring on the Canary Islands (Spain) and Madeira (Portugal).

Description
Picconia excelsa is an evergreen shrub or small tree growing to 10 m tall, usually surpassing the height of the other species in the genus, Picconia azorica. The leaves are opposite, 6–8 cm long, simple, with an entire margin, often curved down at the edges. The fruit is a black drupe 1–2 cm long.

It is threatened by habitat loss.

References

excelsa
Endemic flora of Macaronesia
Flora of Madeira
Flora of the Canary Islands
Trees of Mediterranean climate
Vulnerable plants
Taxonomy articles created by Polbot